Rudolf Veiram (1885 Illuka Parish (now Alutaguse Parish), Kreis Wierland – 1941 Soviet Union) was an Estonian politician. He was a member of II Riigikogu, representing the Workers' United Front. On 18 February 1924, he resigned his position and he was replaced by Aleksander Reinson.

References

1885 births
1941 deaths
People from Alutaguse Parish
People from Kreis Wierland
Workers' United Front politicians
Members of the Riigikogu, 1923–1926